Davidsonia pruriens, also known as ooray, Davidson's plum, or Queensland Davidson's plum, is a medium-sized rainforest tree of northern Queensland, Australia.

The leaves are large and compound. The edible dark burgundy colored fruit is produced in large clusters from the branches or the trunk, depending on the type. There are at least two distinct forms, with a suggestion that one of these is an undescribed species.

The indigenous name - ooray - is being increasingly used by growers and processors.

Habitat 
Various types of wetter, primary rainforests, at elevations from sea level to 1,000 metres.

Uses
The tree is cultivated to a limited extent for its sour fruit, which is used to make jam, sauces, cordial and wine. The fruit is high in antioxidant activity.

Gallery

References

External sources
 Ooray name origin

Flora of New South Wales
Cunoniaceae
Oxalidales of Australia
Bushfood
Crops originating from Australia
Taxa named by Ferdinand von Mueller